McClelland-Layne House is a historic home located at Crawfordsville, Montgomery County, Indiana. It was built in 1869, and is a two-story, "L"-shaped, Italian Villa style brick dwelling.  It has a low-hipped roof and segmental- and round-arched windows.  The house features a three-story tower topped by a low-hipped roof.  It was built for well known Crawfordsville surgeon Dr. James S. McClelland.

It was listed on the National Register of Historic Places in 1985.

References

Houses on the National Register of Historic Places in Indiana
Houses completed in 1869
Italianate architecture in Indiana
Houses in Montgomery County, Indiana
National Register of Historic Places in Montgomery County, Indiana
Crawfordsville, Indiana